

Introduction 
Mugij is a small village in Ratnagiri district, Maharashtra state in Western India. The 2011 Census of India recorded a total of 570 residents in the village. 
In Mugij there are three primary  schools one is Urdu medium and another are Marathi medium. In Mugij there are many religions people are living like Hindu Muslim and Buddha.

Dapoli taluka start with first village Mugij if you go via Mandangad to Dapoli. It is well situated in mountains from 3 sides. Shri Salubai is "Gramdaivat"(lord of village).

Mugij Pin code is 415716 and postal head office is Palgad.

Location 
Mugij is on State Highway SH272 between Mandangad and Dapoli.[3] The nearest Railway Station is Khed which is 30 km away. 26 km. from Dapoli. Mugij is situated beside the banks of a seasonal stream called locally as Dongar and is surrounded on all sides by low hills. It rains in plenty during Monsoon season. The temperature in Mugij varies between 20 and 35 degrees. Ratnagiri District can be physically divided into 3 zones viz. Coastal, Middle and Hilly. Mugij falls under Middle Zone. Middle zone is characterized by a medium altitude. It is more accessible due to the Bombay–Goa Highway as well as the Konkan railway..

Vinhere Rail Way Station is the very nearby railway stations to Mugij. Khed Rail Way Station (near to Khed) are the Rail way stations reachable from near by town.
Gharadi ( 3 KM ) , Shirsoli ( 4 KM ) , Tangar ( 5 KM ) , Shirsadi ( 5 KM ) , Dabhat ( 5 KM ) are the nearby Villages to Mugij. Mugij is surrounded by Dapoli Taluka towards South , Poladpur Taluka towards East , Mahad Taluka towards North , Khed Taluka towards South .

Political Administration
Mugij comes under the Konkan Division of Maharashtra State. It falls under the Raigad Lok Sabha Constituency and Dapoli Vidhan Sabha Constituency. Current MLA and MP representing Mugij are below

Transportation 
Mugij is well-connected by road to nearby big towns. State Highway 272, Mandangad to Dapoli passes from Mugij. Besides buses are also available as per their timings auto-rickshaw are available round-the clock.

Educational facilities 
[[File:S. I. Zilla Parishad Primary Urdu School (IQBAL NAGAR) And Zilla pardishad Marathi School.

Economy 

Mugij economy was hugely dependent on agricultural product till early 1980. Post 1980 most of the young earners head towards metro cities and hence agricultural production gets big hit in coming years. During the same period most of the people started to migrate to Gulf, UK, Canada, Australia, USA for the jobs. Presently 50% of Mugij economy depend on remittance from foreign countries and metro Cities.

Healthcare Facilities  

Mugij has government run Primary Health Center situated at Iqbal Nagar. Apart from this Mugij has Three Diffrent Small Clinics run by resident  Dr.Gaibee ,Dr.Girase, Dr.More .

References

Villages in Ratnagiri district